The 1987 CA-TennisTrophy was a tennis tournament played on indoor hard courts at the Wiener Stadthalle in Vienna, Austria. Brad Gilbert was the defending champion but did not compete that year. Jonas Svensson won in the final 1–6, 1–6, 6–2, 6–3, 7–5 against Amos Mansdorf.

Seeds

  Tim Mayotte (quarterfinals)
  Emilio Sánchez (quarterfinals)
  Anders Järryd (quarterfinals)
  Henri Leconte (first round)
  Jonas Svensson (champion)
  Amos Mansdorf (final)
  Claudio Mezzadri (semifinals)
  Tomáš Šmíd (first round)

Draw

Final

Section 1

Section 2

References

External links
 ATP singles draw

Singles